My Queen, also known as Defeated Queen or Queen of No Marriage, is a 2009 Taiwanese romantic-comedy television series. The television drama was produced by Sanlih E-Television starring Ethan Juan and Cheryl Yang. It was first aired on January 4, 2009 on TTV after Invincible Shan Bao Mei and last aired on May 31, 2009.

Synopsis
Shan Wu Shuang (Cheryl Yang), a 33-year-old beautiful, hardworking yet single woman, meets Lucas (Ethan Juan), a 25-year-old romantic and handsome regular worker. There is an 8-year age difference between the two lovers.

Cast

Main
 Ethan Ruan as Lucas (25 y.o) - Workerman, helper of JJ, sometimes an assistant at iFound magazine and bodyguard of Shan Wu Shuang. He was previously an outstanding medical student, but after the death of Han Xiang-Yun, his girlfriend, his grades dropped and he was expelled from medical school.
 Cheryl Yang as Shan Wu Shuang (33 y.o) - The main editor in iFound magazine's store (social, politics and case department, mid-level chief). She was always top of the class from primary school to university and is hard-working in her jobs. She is single, although she previously had a relationship with Song Yun-Hao and nearly married him, until an accident six years ago caused a misunderstanding between them.
Sylvia Yang as Han Jia Jia (21 y.o) - A new trainee worker at iFound and the younger sister of Han Xiang-Yun (Lucas' ex-girlfriend).
James Wen as Song Yun Hao (34 y.o) - A world-famous cameraman and past-boyfriend of Shan Eu Shuang. He once dated Wu Shuang and wanted to marry her, but because of his job, it didn't come about. He had an accident and did not tell Wu Shuang, which destroyed their love.
Harry Chang  as JJ (25 y.o) - Classmate and best friend of Lucas, and manager of the Hot Spring Hotel. He is dating Han Jia-Jia.

Supporting
Jessica Song as Lu Guang Lin - Teacher and Ke Menghan's wife.
Da Bing as Romeo - Senior editor of iFound magazine; single.
Amanda Chu as Xie Zhiqi - Co-editor of iFound magazine.
Ying Wei-min as Zhang Ruoji - photographer for iFound magazine.
Peixu Li as Weier Gang - Editor of iFound magazine; attracted to Xie Zhiqi
Jun Laiting as Madan Na - Reporter for iFound magazine.
Zhao Zi Qiang (趙自強) as Ceng Dafang - Works for iFound magazine, owns a hotel. He is married to Lin Chunzhi, and they have one child.
Wei-Min Chen as Ke Menghan - Lu Guanglin's husband. They have a daughter.
Lin Mei-hsiu as Dan Lin Chunzhi - Single mother; in love with the head of Warriors High School.
Wang Dao as Lu Tiancheng - Lucas's father; a doctor.

Guest appearances

 Ko Chia-yen as Han Hsiang-yun - Ex-girlfriend of Lucas; has asthma; accidentally drowned in the sea 
 Qu Zhong Heng as Ke You-Zheng - A politician from a small village, and National Party candidate for Prime Minister
 Liu Xiao Li as Ketai Tai - Wife of Ke You and National Party chairman's daughter. 
 Chen Bo Zheng as Xu Zimo - Boyfriend of Lin Chunzhi 
 Du Shi Mei
 Xiang Yu Jie (also known as Xiang Li Wen) as Lin Laoshi -  English teacher at Warriors High School.
 Huang Tai An as a security guard 
 Hei Mian as a Jeweller's shop employee 
 Ma Li Ou as a TV host - Host of "Cheers" and "Love at 5".
 Junior as Edison - Han Jia Jia's ex-boyfriend. He owns a motorbike company. 
 Lene Lai as Lin Mei-Huan - Schoolmate of Lucas in high school. 
 Zhuang Zhuang as the vice-chairman of the Da Wei Hotel.
 Fu Tian-ying as Da Tou-ting - University classmate of Shan Wu Shuang. 
 Zhong Xing-ling as Da Du-yi - University classmate of Shan Wu Shuang.
 Ehlo Huang as Yue Fei - The doctor who did Wu Shuang's pre-marital health check and is attracted to her. 
 Zhang Qin-yan as Chloe - Leslie's helper for many years. 
 Ba Yu as Wu Jing-jing - Adviser to Lai Dian 
 Zhang Zhao-zhi as Mr. Tang - One of main targets for Shan Wu Shuang 
 Sun Peng as the husband of Da Du-yi. He appears in a photo.
 Akio Chen as a manager of an engine store 
 Lu Man-yin as Man-yin Jie - Worker in Hot Spring Hotel, which belongs to JJ's family.
 Ye Min-zhi as an editor of U Watch magazine store 
 Chen Wei-ling as a flower store worker 
 Di Qiu as Xiao Zheng - Classmate of Lucas at school
 Wong JingLun as Xiao Chen - Classmate of Lucas at school
 XuanXuan as A-Rui
 Fish Leong as a radio DJ

Broadcast

Soundtrack

My Queen Original Soundtrack (CD+DVD) ( (1CD+1DVD)) was released on May 22, 2009 by Fish Leong under Believe In Music. It contains seventeen songs, and a DVD version which contains Fish Leong's Fall in Love & Songs album's music video and karaoke. The opening theme song is "No Ifs" or "Ru Guo", while the ending theme song is "The Reason For The Love Of Love".

Track listing

{{tracklist
| headline        = Fall in Love & Songs'''s music video and karaoke DVD
| collapsed       = yes
| title1          = Don't Shed Any More Tears for Him
| title2          =No Ifs
| title3          =Hug Tightly
| title4          =PK
| title5          =Love Song
| title6          =Sky Lantern
| title7          =Dare Not
| title8          =The Reason For The Love Of Love
| title9          =Belonging To
| title10          =Find A Person
| title11          =Bagpiper
| title12          =Nursery Rhymes
}}

Episode ratings
Since its first broadcast, My Queen topped the ranks with the total average of 5.69. Its drama competitors were CTV's Love or Bread, ToGetHer, and Boys Over Flowers, and CTS's Prince + Princess 2 and Knock Knock Loving You. The viewers survey was conducted by AGB Nielsen.

Remake

A South Korean remake titled Witch's Romance (or A Witch's Love'') aired on tvN in 2014, starring Uhm Jung-hwa and Park Seo-joon.

Awards and nominations

References

External links
  My Queen official website on TTV
  My Queen official blog on SETTV

Taiwanese drama television series
Taiwan Television original programming
Sanlih E-Television original programming
2009 Taiwanese television series debuts
2009 Taiwanese television series endings
Taiwanese romantic comedy television series